Rose of the Bowery is a 1927 American silent crime film directed by Bertram Bracken and starring Edna Murphy, * Crauford Kent and Mildred Harris.

Synopsis
A baby is accidentally left the house of a criminal and grows up in New York City's Bowery neighborhood. Later wrongly dragged into a murder case she is revealed to be the daughter of the district attorney.

Cast
 Edna Murphy as 	Rose
 Johnnie Walker
 Crauford Kent	
 Mildred Harris

References

Bibliography
 Connelly, Robert B. The Silents: Silent Feature Films, 1910-36, Volume 40, Issue 2. December Press, 1998.
 Munden, Kenneth White. The American Film Institute Catalog of Motion Pictures Produced in the United States, Part 1. University of California Press, 1997.

External links
 

1927 films
1927 crime films
American silent feature films
American crime films
American black-and-white films
Films directed by Bertram Bracken
Films set in New York City
1920s English-language films
1920s American films